Boris Arbuzov may refer to:

Boris Arbuzov (chemist) (1903–1991), Russian and Soviet chemist
Boris Arbuzov (physicist) (born 1938), Russian and Soviet physicist